The 1-inch Nordenfelt gun was an early rapid-firing light gun intended to defend larger warships against the new small fast-moving torpedo boats in the late 1870s to the 1890s.

Description 
The gun was an enlarged version of the successful rifle-calibre Nordenfelt hand-cranked "machine gun" designed by Helge Palmcrantz and was intended to combine its rapid rate of fire with a projectile capable of deterring attacking torpedo boats. The gun fired a solid steel bullet with hardened tip and brass jacket: under the terms of the St. Petersburg Declaration of 1868, exploding shells weighing less than 400 grams were not allowed to be used in warfare between the signatory nations.

The gun was used in one, two and four-barrel versions. The ammunition was fed by gravity from a hopper above the breech subdivided into separate columns for each barrel. The gunner loaded and fired the multiple barrels by moving a lever on the right side of the gun forward and backwards. Pulling the lever backwards extracted the fired cartridges, pushing it forward then loaded fresh cartridges into all the barrels, and the final part of the forward motion fired all the barrels, one at a time in quick succession. Hence the gun functioned as a type of volley gun, firing bullets in bursts, compared to the contemporary Gatling gun and the true machine guns which succeeded it such as the Maxim gun, which fired at a steady continuous rate.

The gunner was occupied with manually operating the loading and firing lever, while the gun captain aimed the gun and operated the elevation and training handwheels.

Ammunition

Surviving examples 
 A 4-barreled gun at United States Army Ordnance Museum, MD, USA
 A 4-barreled gun in The Gardens, Bundaberg, Queensland, Australia 
 A 2-barreled gun in The Gardens, Bundaberg, Queensland, Australia 
 A 2-barreled gun at Queens Park, Maryborough, Queensland, Australia 
 A 2-barrelled gun at the Australian War Memorial museum, Canberra ACT Australia.
 A 4-barrelled gun at the Tower of London
 A 5-barrelled gun at Chatham Historic Dockyard
 A 2-barreled 1in gun at the QEII Army Memorial Museum Waiouru New Zealand.
 A 4-barrelled 25mm gun at the Royal Norwegian Navy Museum in Horten.

See also 
 List of naval guns

Notes and references

Bibliography 
 Text Book of Gunnery, 1887. LONDON: PRINTED FOR HIS MAJESTY'S STATIONERY OFFICE, BY HARRISON AND SONS, ST. MARTIN'S LANE

External links 

 Handbook for Nordenfelt gun, l-in. 2-Barrel, Mark I. 1886 at State Library of Victoria
 Handbook for the 1" 4-barrel Nordenfelt gun : 1886 at State Library of Victoria
 Handbook of the 1" 4 barrel Nordenfelt gun, 1889 at State Library of Victoria
 Handbook of the 1" 4-barrel Nordenfelt gun, 1894 at State Library of Victoria
 Handbook for Nordenfelt gun, 1-inch, 2 barrel, Mark I, 1895 at State Library of Victoria
 Description, Drill, Ammunition. Manual for Victorian Naval Forces 1887, pages 41 - 52 from HMVS Cerberus website
 1 inch 4-barrel Nordenfelt Mk III Machine-Gun History, technical details, animations
 1 inch 2-barrel Nordenfelt Machine-Gun History, technical details, animations
 Animation of the inner workings of the 1 inch 4-barrel Nordenfelt, first model mechanism
 Animation of the inner workings of the 1 inch 2-barrel Nordenfelt, second model mechanism

Naval guns of the United Kingdom
Victorian-era weapons of the United Kingdom
25 mm artillery